Glenn Miller Time is a 1961 summer replacement American television series that aired on CBS Television.

Background
The series featured the orchestra of Glenn Miller, under the direction of bandleader and drummer Ray McKinley, who was the leader of the post-war Glenn Miller orchestra. McKinley had worked with Miller when they were members of the Dorsey Brothers Orchestra in 1934. They were also both part of the World War II Army Air Force Band which was stationed in the UK in 1944.

Ray McKinley was the co-host with Johnny Desmond in the ten episodes of the series. Patty Clark was a regular singer on the series, which was targeted at a nostalgic audience which grew up during the big band and swing era. Johnny Olson was the announcer.

A 30-minute series, approx. 25 minutes minus ads, Glenn Miller Time was sponsored by Kent cigarettes and Jell-O. Glenn Miller Time was the summer replacement for the series Hennesey.

Reception
A contemporary account called Glenn Miller Time a "pleasing, undemanding musical half hour. Another account said "watching the Miller show is almost enough to renew the faith of TV's loudest critics" and called it a "soothing half hour".

References

External links
Glenn Miller Time on IMDb
Two public domain episodes of the series appear on the Internet Archive: Unknown episode and finale

1961 American television series debuts
1961 American television series endings
1960s American variety television series
Black-and-white American television shows
CBS original programming